The Play Girl is a 1928 American silent romantic comedy film directed by Arthur Rosson and starring Madge Bellamy, Johnny Mack Brown and Walter McGrail.

Cast
 Madge Bellamy as Madge Norton  
 Johnny Mack Brown as Bradley Lane  
 Walter McGrail as David Courtney  
 Lionel Belmore as The Greek Florist  
 Anita Garvin as Millie  
 Thelma Hill as The Salesgirl  
 Harry Tenbrook as The Chauffeur 
 Mae Madison as Flapper  
 Bertram Marburgh as Socialite

References

Bibliography
 Solomon, Aubrey. The Fox Film Corporation, 1915-1935: A History and Filmography. McFarland, 2011.

External links

1928 films
1928 romantic comedy films
American romantic comedy films
Films directed by Arthur Rosson
American silent feature films
Fox Film films
American black-and-white films
1920s English-language films
1920s American films
Silent romantic comedy films
Silent American comedy films